Tropic Holiday is a 1938 American musical film directed by Theodore Reed and starring Bob Burns, Dorothy Lamour and Ray Milland.

The film was nominated for the Academy Award's  Best Original Score.

Cast
 Bob Burns as Breck Jones
 Dorothy Lamour as Manuela
 Ray Milland as Ken Warren
 Martha Raye as Midge Miller
 Binnie Barnes as Marilyn Joyce
 Tito Guizar as Ramón
 Elvira Ríos as Rosa

External links

 

1938 films
1938 musical films
American black-and-white films
Films directed by Theodore Reed
Paramount Pictures films
American musical films
1930s English-language films
1930s American films